Little People Big World: Wedding Farm is an American reality documentary series that debuted on November 13, 2012 on TLC. The series is a spin-off of Little People, Big World.

Premise
The series follows Amy and Matthew Roloff as they venture into the wedding planning business. The series will also encompass the daily lives of the family, just like their original series Little People, Big World.

Episodes

Season 1 (2012)

References

2010s American reality television series
2012 American television series debuts
2012 American television series endings
English-language television shows
TLC (TV network) original programming
American television spin-offs
Reality television spin-offs